Qunchamarka (Quechua, Hispanicized spelling Conchamarca, Conchamarka, Qonchamarca, regionally also spelled 'Qonchamarka') is an archaeological site in Peru located in the Cusco Region, Urubamba Province, Machupicchu District, southwest of the mountain Runkuraqay. It lies between the archaeological sites Sayaqmarka and Phuyupatamarka on the Inca Trail to Machu Picchu.

See also 
 Inti Punku
 Pakaymayu
 Warmi Wañusqa
 Wiñay Wayna

References 

Archaeological sites in Peru
Archaeological sites in Cusco Region